The Worshipful Company of Pattenmakers is one of the Livery Companies of the City of London. The Pattenmakers, who were incorporated by Royal Charter in 1670, were makers of wooden-soled overshoes. Pattens in previous times were helpful to pedestrians negotiating the muddy streets of London. However, with the advent of paved streets and rubber galoshes, pattens became obsolete by the end of the 19th century. Thus, the company's main function is now as a charitable body rather than a guild or trade association for pattenmakers.

The Pattenmakers' Company ranks seventieth in the order of precedence of City Livery Companies. Its motto is Recipiunt Fœminæ Sustentacula Nobis, Latin for "Women Receive Support From Us".

Since the 15th century, the Pattenmakers have been affiliated with St Margaret Pattens, a Wren church located in Eastcheap.

References

External links
 The Pattenmakers' Company

Pattenmakers
1670 establishments in England
Shoemakers